Daniel Gibson Johnson (born September 8, 1995) is a former American soccer player who played as a midfielder.

Career

Youth and college
Johnson played for West Ham United's youth academy from 2009 to 2012. After that, he played for the Louisville Cardinals in the NCAA.

Professional

Johnson was drafted 11th overall by the Chicago Fire in the 2017 MLS SuperDraft. He played his first game on April 1, coming on as a substitute in a 2–2 draw against Montreal Impact.

Johnson was released by Chicago at the end of their 2018 season.

On February 15, 2019, Johnson signed with Birmingham Legion FC of the USL Championship.

References

External links

 
 

1995 births
Living people
People from Duluth, Georgia
Sportspeople from the Atlanta metropolitan area
Soccer players from Georgia (U.S. state)
American soccer players
Association football wingers
Association football midfielders
Maryland Terrapins men's soccer players
Louisville Cardinals men's soccer players
Orlando City U-23 players
Des Moines Menace players
Portland Timbers U23s players
Chicago Fire FC draft picks
Chicago Fire FC players
Birmingham Legion FC players
USL League Two players
Major League Soccer players